Tetsuo Yokoyama is a Japanese mixed martial artist.

Mixed martial arts record

|-
| Win
| align=center| 1-2-1
| Kengo Tsuchida
| Submission (kimura)
| Shooto - Shooto
| 
| align=center| 3
| align=center| 2:42
| Tokyo, Japan
| 
|-
| Loss
| align=center| 0-2-1
| Kenichi Tanaka
| Submission (achilles lock)
| Shooto - Shooto
| 
| align=center| 1
| align=center| 0:21
| Tokyo, Japan
| 
|-
| Draw
| align=center| 0-1-1
| Tomoyuki Saito
| Draw
| Shooto - Shooto
| 
| align=center| 3
| align=center| 3:00
| Tokyo, Japan
| 
|-
| Loss
| align=center| 0-1
| Kazuhiro Sakamoto
| Submission (armbar)
| Shooto - Shooto
| 
| align=center| 1
| align=center| 0:00
| Tokyo, Japan
|

See also
List of male mixed martial artists

References

External links
 
 Tetsuo Yokoyama at mixedmartialarts.com

Japanese male mixed martial artists
Living people
Year of birth missing (living people)